United Nations Security Council Resolution 414, adopted on 15 September 1977, after hearing from the Permanent Representative of the Republic of Cyprus, the Council expressed concern at recent developments in the country, particularly in the Famagusta area. It noted the urgency of progress on a peace settlement, reaffirming resolutions 365 (1974), 367 (1975) and General Assembly Resolution 2312 (1974).

The Council asked the Secretary-General to continue to monitor the situation.

The resolution was adopted without vote.

See also
 Cyprus dispute
 List of United Nations Security Council Resolutions 401 to 500 (1976–1982)
 Turkish Invasion of Cyprus

References
Text of the Resolution at undocs.org

External links
 

 0414
 0414
September 1977 events
1977 in Cyprus